In the geometry of hyperbolic 3-space, the order-infinite-3 triangular honeycomb (or 3,∞,3 honeycomb) is a regular space-filling tessellation (or honeycomb) with Schläfli symbol {3,∞,3}.

Geometry
It has three Infinite-order triangular tiling {3,∞} around each edge. All vertices are ultra-ideal (existing beyond the ideal boundary) with infinitely many triangular tilings existing around each vertex in an order-3 apeirogonal tiling vertex figure.

Related polytopes and honeycombs 

It is a part of a sequence of regular honeycombs with Infinite-order triangular tiling cells: {3,∞,p}.

It is a part of a sequence of regular honeycombs with order-3 apeirogonal tiling vertex figures: {p,∞,3}.

It is a part of a sequence of self-dual regular honeycombs: {p,∞,p}.

Order-infinite-4 triangular honeycomb

In the geometry of hyperbolic 3-space, the order-infinite-4 triangular honeycomb (or 3,∞,4 honeycomb) is a regular space-filling tessellation (or honeycomb) with Schläfli symbol {3,∞,4}.

It has four infinite-order triangular tilings, {3,∞}, around each edge. All vertices are ultra-ideal (existing beyond the ideal boundary) with infinitely many infinite-order triangular tilings existing around each vertex in an order-4 apeirogonal tiling vertex figure.

It has a second construction as a uniform honeycomb, Schläfli symbol {3,∞1,1}, Coxeter diagram, with alternating types or colors of infinite-order triangular tiling cells. In Coxeter notation the half symmetry is [3,∞,4,1+] = [3,∞1,1].

Order-infinite-5 triangular honeycomb

In the geometry of hyperbolic 3-space, the order-infinite-3 triangular honeycomb (or 3,∞,5 honeycomb) is a regular space-filling tessellation (or honeycomb) with Schläfli symbol {3,∞,5}. It has five infinite-order triangular tiling, {3,∞}, around each edge. All vertices are ultra-ideal (existing beyond the ideal boundary) with infinitely many infinite-order triangular tilings existing around each vertex in an order-5 apeirogonal tiling vertex figure.

Order-infinite-6 triangular honeycomb

In the geometry of hyperbolic 3-space, the order-infinite-6 triangular honeycomb (or 3,∞,6 honeycomb) is a regular space-filling tessellation (or honeycomb) with Schläfli symbol {3,∞,6}. It has infinitely many infinite-order triangular tiling, {3,∞}, around each edge. All vertices are ultra-ideal (existing beyond the ideal boundary) with infinitely many infinite-order triangular tilings existing around each vertex in an order-6 apeirogonal tiling, {∞,6}, vertex figure.

Order-infinite-7 triangular honeycomb

In the geometry of hyperbolic 3-space, the order-infinite-7 triangular honeycomb (or 3,∞,6 honeycomb) is a regular space-filling tessellation (or honeycomb) with Schläfli symbol {3,∞,7}. It has infinitely many infinite-order triangular tiling, {3,∞}, around each edge. All vertices are ultra-ideal (existing beyond the ideal boundary) with infinitely many infinite-order triangular tilings existing around each vertex in an order-7 apeirogonal tiling, {∞,7}, vertex figure.

Order-infinite-infinite triangular honeycomb

In the geometry of hyperbolic 3-space, the order-infinite-infinite triangular honeycomb (or 3,∞,∞ honeycomb) is a regular space-filling tessellation (or honeycomb) with Schläfli symbol {3,∞,∞}. It has infinitely many infinite-order triangular tiling, {3,∞}, around each edge. All vertices are ultra-ideal (existing beyond the ideal boundary) with infinitely many infinite-order triangular tilings existing around each vertex in an infinite-order apeirogonal tiling, {∞,∞}, vertex figure.

It has a second construction as a uniform honeycomb, Schläfli symbol {3,(∞,∞,∞)}, Coxeter diagram,  = , with alternating types or colors of infinite-order triangular tiling cells. In Coxeter notation the half symmetry is [3,∞,∞,1+] = [3,((∞,∞,∞))].

Order-infinite-3 square honeycomb

In the geometry of hyperbolic 3-space, the order-infinite-3 square honeycomb (or 4,∞,3 honeycomb) a regular space-filling tessellation (or honeycomb). Each infinite cell consists of a heptagonal tiling whose vertices lie on a 2-hypercycle, each of which has a limiting circle on the ideal sphere.

The Schläfli symbol of the order-infinite-3 square honeycomb is {4,∞,3}, with three infinite-order square tilings meeting at each edge. The vertex figure of this honeycomb is an order-3 apeirogonal tiling, {∞,3}.

Order-infinite-3 pentagonal honeycomb

In the geometry of hyperbolic 3-space, the order-infinite-3 pentagonal honeycomb (or 5,∞,3 honeycomb) a regular space-filling tessellation (or honeycomb). Each infinite cell consists of an infinite-order pentagonal tiling whose vertices lie on a 2-hypercycle, each of which has a limiting circle on the ideal sphere.

The Schläfli symbol of the order-6-3 pentagonal honeycomb is {5,∞,3}, with three infinite-order pentagonal tilings meeting at each edge. The vertex figure of this honeycomb is a heptagonal tiling, {∞,3}.

Order-infinite-3 hexagonal honeycomb

In the geometry of hyperbolic 3-space, the order-infinite-3 hexagonal honeycomb (or 6,∞,3 honeycomb) a regular space-filling tessellation (or honeycomb). Each infinite cell consists of an order-3 apeirogonal tiling whose vertices lie on a 2-hypercycle, each of which has a limiting circle on the ideal sphere.

The Schläfli symbol of the order-infinite-3 hexagonal honeycomb is {6,∞,3}, with three infinite-order hexagonal tilings meeting at each edge.  The vertex figure of this honeycomb is an order-3 apeirogonal tiling, {∞,3}.

Order-infinite-3 heptagonal honeycomb

In the geometry of hyperbolic 3-space, the order-infinite-3 heptagonal honeycomb (or 7,∞,3 honeycomb) a regular space-filling tessellation (or honeycomb). Each infinite cell consists of an infinite-order heptagonal tiling whose vertices lie on a 2-hypercycle, each of which has a limiting circle on the ideal sphere.

The Schläfli symbol of the order-infinite-3 heptagonal honeycomb is {7,∞,3}, with three infinite-order heptagonal tilings meeting at each edge.  The vertex figure of this honeycomb is an order-3 apeirogonal tiling, {∞,3}.

Order-infinite-3 apeirogonal honeycomb

In the geometry of hyperbolic 3-space, the order-infinite-3 apeirogonal honeycomb (or ∞,∞,3 honeycomb) a regular space-filling tessellation (or honeycomb). Each infinite cell consists of an infinite-order apeirogonal tiling whose vertices lie on a 2-hypercycle, each of which has a limiting circle on the ideal sphere.

The Schläfli symbol of the apeirogonal tiling honeycomb is {∞,∞,3}, with three infinite-order apeirogonal tilings meeting at each edge.  The vertex figure of this honeycomb is an infinite-order apeirogonal tiling, {∞,3}.

The "ideal surface" projection below is a plane-at-infinity, in the Poincaré half-space model of H3. It shows an Apollonian gasket pattern of circles inside a largest circle.

Order-infinite-4 square honeycomb

In the geometry of hyperbolic 3-space, the order-infinite-4 square honeycomb (or 4,∞,4 honeycomb) a regular space-filling tessellation (or honeycomb) with Schläfli symbol {4,∞,4}.

All vertices are ultra-ideal (existing beyond the ideal boundary) with four infinite-order square tilings existing around each edge and with an order-4 apeirogonal tiling vertex figure.

It has a second construction as a uniform honeycomb, Schläfli symbol {4,∞1,1}, Coxeter diagram, with alternating types or colors of cells. In Coxeter notation the half symmetry is [4,∞,4,1+] = [4,∞1,1].

Order-infinite-5 pentagonal honeycomb

In the geometry of hyperbolic 3-space, the order-infinite-5 pentagonal honeycomb (or 5,∞,5 honeycomb) a regular space-filling tessellation (or honeycomb) with Schläfli symbol {5,∞,5}.

All vertices are ultra-ideal (existing beyond the ideal boundary) with five infinite-order pentagonal tilings existing around each edge and with an order-5 apeirogonal tiling vertex figure.

Order-infinite-6 hexagonal honeycomb

In the geometry of hyperbolic 3-space, the order-infinite-6 hexagonal honeycomb (or 6,∞,6 honeycomb) is a regular space-filling tessellation (or honeycomb) with Schläfli symbol {6,∞,6}. It has six infinite-order hexagonal tilings, {6,∞}, around each edge. All vertices are ultra-ideal (existing beyond the ideal boundary) with infinitely many hexagonal tilings existing around each vertex in an order-6 apeirogonal tiling vertex figure.

It has a second construction as a uniform honeycomb, Schläfli symbol {6,(∞,3,∞)}, Coxeter diagram, with alternating types or colors of cells. In Coxeter notation the half symmetry is [6,∞,6,1+] = [6,((∞,3,∞))].

Order-infinite-7 heptagonal honeycomb

In the geometry of hyperbolic 3-space, the order-infinite-7 heptagonal honeycomb (or 7,∞,7 honeycomb) is a regular space-filling tessellation (or honeycomb) with Schläfli symbol {7,∞,7}. It has seven infinite-order heptagonal tilings, {7,∞}, around each edge. All vertices are ultra-ideal (existing beyond the ideal boundary) with infinitely many heptagonal tilings existing around each vertex in an order-7 apeirogonal tiling vertex figure.

Order-infinite-infinite apeirogonal honeycomb 

In the geometry of hyperbolic 3-space, the order-infinite-infinite apeirogonal honeycomb (or ∞,∞,∞ honeycomb) is a regular space-filling tessellation (or honeycomb) with Schläfli symbol {∞,∞,∞}. It has infinitely many infinite-order apeirogonal tiling {∞,∞} around each edge. All vertices are ultra-ideal (existing beyond the ideal boundary) with infinitely many infinite-order apeirogonal tilings existing around each vertex in an infinite-order apeirogonal tiling vertex figure.

It has a second construction as a uniform honeycomb, Schläfli symbol {∞,(∞,∞,∞)}, Coxeter diagram, with alternating types or colors of cells.

See also 
 Convex uniform honeycombs in hyperbolic space
 List of regular polytopes

References 

Coxeter, Regular Polytopes, 3rd. ed., Dover Publications, 1973. . (Tables I and II: Regular polytopes and honeycombs, pp. 294–296)
 The Beauty of Geometry: Twelve Essays (1999), Dover Publications,  (Chapter 10, Regular Honeycombs in Hyperbolic Space) Table III
 Jeffrey R. Weeks The Shape of Space, 2nd edition  (Chapters 16–17: Geometries on Three-manifolds I,II)
 George Maxwell, Sphere Packings and Hyperbolic Reflection Groups, JOURNAL OF ALGEBRA 79,78-97 (1982) 
 Hao Chen, Jean-Philippe Labbé, Lorentzian Coxeter groups and Boyd-Maxwell ball packings, (2013)
 Visualizing Hyperbolic Honeycombs arXiv:1511.02851 Roice Nelson, Henry Segerman (2015)

External links
 Hyperbolic Catacombs Carousel:  {3,∞,3} honeycomb YouTube, Roice Nelson
John Baez, Visual insights: {7,3,3} Honeycomb (2014/08/01) {7,3,3} Honeycomb Meets Plane at Infinity (2014/08/14) 
 Danny Calegari, Kleinian, a tool for visualizing Kleinian groups, Geometry and the Imagination 4 March 2014. 

Honeycombs (geometry)